Seda Vertis North is a hotel in Quezon City, Metro Manila, Philippines.

History
Seda Vertis North is part of Ayala Land's mixed-used development called Vertis North. The groundbreaking for Vertis North's commercial phase which includes the hotel took place in late 2013. The facility was meant to be built as a "city-center type" of hotel. It is part of the Seda Hotel chain of AyalaLand Hotels and Resorts of Ayala Land which was established in 2012.

The Seda Vertis North, started partial operations on April 23, 2017 when it had its soft opening. It became the sixth hotel under the Seda hotel chain. It had its grand opening, months later, on October 11, 2017.

Facilities
Seda Vertis North operates inside a 24-storey building and has 438 rooms. Its rooms are categorized as either deluxe rooms, club Rooms, premier rooms, and suites. The hotel features the  Presidential Suite which is often booked by business executives.

Other facilities include a  ballroom and a  pool with a bar. The hotel also host a 250-person-capacity Italian-Japanese-Filipino restaurant called Misto and the Straight Up Roofdeck bar.

The hotel building of Seda Vertis North received a LEED-Gold certification in 2019 for its green building design and operation standards. The hotel's facilities and services have also been given a five-star rating by the Department of Tourism based on its National Accommodation Standards for hotels within the first year of Seda Vertis North's operation.

References

Hotels in Metro Manila
Hotels established in 2017
Buildings and structures in Quezon City